Here are lists of schools which only admit boys, in the United States

Arkansas
 Catholic High School for Boys (Little Rock)

California
 Cathedral High School (Los Angeles)
 Crespi Carmelite High School (Los Angeles)
 Damien High School (La Verne)
 DBTI (Rosemead)
 Loyola High School (Los Angeles)
 Salesian High School (Los Angeles)
 Saint Francis High School (La Cañada Flintridge)
 Servite High School (Anaheim)
 St. John Bosco High School (Bellflower)
 St. Michael's Preparatory School (Silverado)
 Verbum Dei High School (Los Angeles)
 YULA Boys High School (Los Angeles)
Bay Area:
 Bellarmine College Preparatory (San Jose)
 Cathedral School for Boys (San Francisco)
 De La Salle High School (Concord)
 Junípero Serra High School (San Mateo)
 Archbishop Riordan High School (San Francisco)
 Stuart Hall for Boys (San Francisco)
 Stuart Hall High School (San Francisco)
 Town School for Boys (San Francisco)
San Diego area:
 St. Augustine High School (San Diego)

Connecticut
 Brunswick School (Greenwich)
 Fairfield College Preparatory School (Fairfield)
 Notre Dame High School (West Haven)
 Xavier High School (Middletown)

Delaware
 Salesianum School (Wilmington)
 St. Edmond's Academy (Wilmington)

District of Columbia (Washington, D.C.)
 Gonzaga College High School
 St. Anselm's Abbey School
 St. Albans School

Florida
 Miami area
 Young Men's Preparatory Academy (Miami)
 Belen Jesuit Preparatory School
 Christopher Columbus High School
 Klurman Mesivta High School for Boys
 Mesifta of Greater Miami
 Yeshiva Toras Chaim / Dr. Abe Chames High School
 Tampa/St. Petersburg
 Jesuit High School (Tampa)

Georgia
 The B.E.S.T. Academy (Atlanta)
 Ivy Preparatory Young Men’s Leadership Academy (Atlanta)
 Benedictine Military School (Savannah)

Pinecrest Academy (Cumming) puts boys and girls in separate classes.

Illinois
 Chicago area
 Urban Prep Academies (Chicago)
 Brother Rice High School (Chicago)
 De La Salle Institute (boys' campus) (Chicago)
 Fasman Yeshiva High School (Skokie)
 Leo Catholic High School (Chicago)
 Marmion Academy (Aurora)
 Mount Carmel High School (Chicago)
 Northridge Preparatory School (Niles)
 Notre Dame College Prep (Niles)
 St. Laurence High School (Burbank)
 St. Patrick High School (Chicago)
 St. Rita of Cascia High School (Chicago)

 Became coeducational
 DePaul College Prep (Chicago)
 Hales Franciscan High School (Chicago)
 Holy Trinity High School (Chicago)
 St. Joseph High School (Westchester, Illinois)

 Merged
 Cathedral High School (Belleville area/Southern Illinois)
 Joliet Catholic High School (Joliet)
 Roncalli High School (Aurora)
 St. Procopius College and Academy (Lisle/Chicago)
 St. Mel High School (Chicago)

 Closed
 Weber High School

Indiana
 Former
 Gibault School for Boys

Kentucky
 Louisville
 DeSales High School
 St. Xavier High School
 Trinity High School
 Northern Kentucky
 Covington Catholic High School (Park Hills)
 Former boys' schools
 Bishop David High School (Louisville; merged with the all-girls' Angela Merici High School in 1984 to form the current Holy Cross High School)
 Flaget High School (Louisville; merged with the all-girls' Loretto High School in 1973 before closing the next year)
 Newport Catholic High School (Newport; merged into the coeducational Newport Central Catholic High School in 1983)

Louisiana
 East Baton Rouge Parish
 Catholic High School (Baton Rouge)

 New Orleans (Orleans Parish)
 Brother Martin High School (New Orleans)
 Holy Cross School (New Orleans)
 Jesuit High School (New Orleans)
 Archbishop Rummel High School (Metairie)
 Archbishop Shaw High School (Marrero)
 St. Augustine High School (New Orleans)
 St. Paul's School (Covington)
 Christian Brothers School (New Orleans) boys' middle school - The school has a PK-4 coeducational elementary school in both locations, an all girls' 5-7 middle school in the Canal Street Campus, and an all boys' 5-7 middle school in the City Park Campus.

 St. Landry Parish
 Berchmans Academy of the Sacred Heart (Grand Coteau)

 Became coeducational
 De La Salle High School (New Orleans; opened 1949; became coed 1992)

 Closed
 Miller-McCoy Academy (New Orleans)
 Alcee Fortier High School (New Orleans) (was coeducational for many years)

Maryland
 Baltimore area
 Archbishop Curley High School
 Boys' Latin School of Maryland
 Calvert Hall College High School
 Gilman School
 Loyola Blakefield
 Mount Saint Joseph High School
  St. Paul's School for Boys 
 Washington, DC area
 DeMatha Catholic High School
 Georgetown Preparatory School
 The Avalon School
 The Heights School
 Landon School
 Mater Dei School

Former boys' schools:
 Closed
 Cardinal Gibbons School (Baltimore)
 Became coeducational
 Bishop McNamara High School (DC area)
 Tome School for Boys

Massachusetts
 Belmont Hill School
 St. Paul's Choir School

Former boys' schools
 Became coeducational
 Boston Latin School (in 1972)
 The English High School (in 1972)
 Central Catholic High School (in 1996)
 The Newman School for Boys, now The Newman School

Michigan
 Detroit area
 Douglass Academy for Young Men (Detroit)
 Brother Rice High School (Bloomfield Township)
 De La Salle Collegiate High School (Warren)
 Detroit Catholic Central High School (Novi)
 St. Mary's Preparatory (Orchard Lake Village)
 University of Detroit Jesuit High School and Academy (Detroit)

 Closed
 Austin Catholic Preparatory School (Detroit)
 Notre Dame High School (Harper Woods)

Minnesota
 Saint Thomas Academy

Mississippi
 Saint Stanislaus College

Missouri
 Rockhurst High School

Nebraska
 Former
 Father Flanagan's Boys' Home (Boys Town)

New Hampshire
 Cardigan Mountain School

 Now coeducational
 Pinkerton Academy

New Jersey
 New York City area
 Eagle Academy for Young Men of Newark
 Bergen Catholic High School (Oradell)
 Delbarton School (Morristown)
 Don Bosco Preparatory High School (Don Bosco)
 Neumann Preparatory School (Wayne)
 Oratory Preparatory School (Summit)
 Rav Teitz Mesivta Academy (Elizabeth)
 Saint Benedict's Preparatory School (Newark)
 Saint Joseph Regional High School (Montvale)
 Seton Hall Preparatory School (West Orange)
 Torah Academy of Bergen County (Teaneck)
 Philadelphia area/South Jersey
 St. Augustine Preparatory School (Buena Vista Township)
 Trenton area
 Christian Brothers Academy (Middletown Township)
 American Boychoir School (Hopewell)

 Merged
 Thomas Jefferson High School into Elizabeth High School

New York
in New York City:
 Bronx
 Eagle Academy for Young Men of the Bronx
 All Hallows High School
 Cardinal Hayes High School
 Fordham Preparatory School
 Mount Saint Michael Academy
 St. Raymond High School for Boys
 Brooklyn
 Eagle Academy for Young Men Ocean Hill/Brownsville
 Excellence Boys Charter School 
 Gerer Mesivta Bais Yisroel School
 Mesivta of Seagate School
 Mikdash Melech Mechina School
 Sinai Academy
 Tiferes Academy
 Torah Academy High School
 United Lubavitcher Yeshiva
 Yeshiva Chanoch Lenaar
 Yeshiva Derech HaTorah High School
 Yeshiva Gedolah of Midwood
 Yeshiva Karunas Halev
 Yeshiva Rabbi Chaim Berlin
 Yeshiva Tiferes Yisroel
 Yeshiva Toraf Hesed
 Yeshiva Vyelipol School
 Yeshivat Shaare Torah Boys High School
 Manhattan
 Eagle Academy for Young Men of Harlem
 Browning School
 Buckley School
 Collegiate School
 La Salle Academy
 Regis High School
 St. Bernard's School
 Saint Thomas Choir School
 Xavier High School
 Yeshiva University High School for Boys
 Queens
 Eagle Academy for Young Men Southeast, Queens
 Cathedral Preparatory School and Seminary
 Holy Cross High School
 Mesivta Ohr Torah School  	 
 Mesivta Yesodei Yeshurun
 Yeshiva Berachel David-Torah School 	 
 Yeshiva Binat Chaim - Boys School 	 
 Yeshiva of Far Rockaway 	  	 
 Yeshiva Shaar Hatoreh Research
 Staten Island
 Eagle Academy for Young Men of Staten Island
 Monsignor Farrell High School
 St. Peter's Boys High School
 Yeshiva of Staten Island

Outside of New York City:
 Hudson Valley
 Archbishop Stepinac High School
 Avir Yaakov Boys School
 Iona Preparatory School
 Salesian High School
 Long Island
 Chaminade High School

Former boys' schools:
 Became coeducational
 Loyola School (Manhattan)
 Monsignor McClancy Memorial High School (Queens)
 New York Military Academy
 St. Francis Preparatory School (Queens)
 Xaverian High School (Brooklyn)
 Closed
 Brooklyn Preparatory School
 Rice High School (Manhattan)
 St. Agnes Boys High School (Manhattan)
 St. Nicholas of Tolentine High School (Bronx)

Ohio
 Columbus
 Saint Charles Preparatory School
 Cincinnati area
 Elder High School
 La Salle High School
 Moeller High School
 St. Xavier High School
 Cleveland area
 Ginn Academy (Cleveland)
 Benedictine High School
 St. Edward High School
 Saint Ignatius High School (Cleveland)
 University School
 Dayton
 Dayton Boys Preparatory Academy
 Toledo area
 St. Francis de Sales High School
 St. John's Jesuit High School and Academy

 Former boys' schools
 Cathedral Latin School (Cleveland Area) (merged into coeducational school)
 St. Joseph High School (Cleveland area) (merged into coeducational school)

Pennsylvania
 Philadelphia area
 Boys' Latin of Philadelphia Charter School
 Devon Preparatory School
 Father Judge High School
 Holy Ghost Preparatory School
 La Salle College High School
 Malvern Preparatory School
 Monsignor Bonner High School
 Roman Catholic High School 
 Saint Joseph's Preparatory School
 Pittsburgh area
 Central Catholic High School

Former boys' schools:
 Closed
 Northeast Catholic High School (Philadelphia)
 St. James High School for Boys, Chester
 The Young Men's Leadership School at Thomas E. FitzSimons High School (Philadelphia)
 Merged
 Monsignor Bonner High School, into Bonner & Prendergast Catholic High School (which initially had separate gender campuses)
 Saint John Neumann High School (Philadelphia) into Saints John Neumann and Maria Goretti Catholic High School
 West Philadelphia Catholic High School for Boys into West Philadelphia Catholic High School
 Became coeducational
 Central High School (Philadelphia)
 Milton Hershey School (Derry Township)
 The Hill School (Pottstown)
 Valley Forge Military Academy and College (Radnor Township)
 Cardinal Wuerl North Catholic High School (Pittsburgh)

Tennessee
 Memphis University School

Texas
 Dallas-Fort Worth
 Barack Obama Male Leadership Academy (Dallas)
 Cistercian Preparatory School (Irving)
 Jesuit College Preparatory School of Dallas (Dallas)
 St. Mark's School (Dallas)
 Young Men’s Leadership Academy at Fred F. Florence Middle School (Dallas)
 Young Men's Leadership Academy at Kennedy Middle School (Grand Prairie)
 El Paso
 Cathedral High School
 Houston
 Mickey Leland College Preparatory Academy for Young Men
 The Regis School of the Sacred Heart
 St. Thomas High School
 Strake Jesuit College Preparatory 
 The Lawson Academy (formerly William A. Lawson Institute for Peace and Prosperity (WALIPP) - Texas Southern University (TSU) Preparatory Academy) - boys' program
 San Antonio
 Central Catholic Marianist High School 

 Became coeducational
 Holy Cross of San Antonio (San Antonio)
 Pro-Vision Academy
 St. Anthony Catholic High School (San Antonio)

Virginia
 Woodberry Forest School
 St. Christopher's School

King Abdullah Academy is coeducational but has separate boys' secondary classes.

Collegiate School is coeducational but puts boys and girls in separate classes during the Middle School years.

Became coeducational:
 Bishop Ireton High School

Washington (state)
 Annie Wright Schools has a separate boys' high school

Guam
 Father Dueñas Memorial School

Correctional facilities
Note that some juvenile correctional facilities are named as "Boys' School" or "School for Boys", such as:
 Closed
 Florida School for Boys (Arthur Dozier)
 Gatesville State School for Boys

See also
 List of girls' schools in the United States

References

 
Boys